Branko Zupan (born 22 September 1964) is a former Slovenian footballer and manager.

References

External links
 
 PrvaLiga profile 

1964 births
Living people
Sportspeople from Maribor
Yugoslav footballers
Slovenian footballers
Association football goalkeepers
FC Koper players
NK Olimpija Ljubljana (1945–2005) players
ND Gorica players
NK Celje players
Yugoslav Second League players
Slovenian PrvaLiga players
Slovenia international footballers
Slovenian football managers
Slovenian expatriate sportspeople in Italy
ND Gorica managers
Slovenian expatriate football managers
Expatriate football managers in Italy